Räägu may refer to several places in Estonia:
Räägu, Pärnu County, village in Sauga Parish, Pärnu County
Räägu, Viljandi County, village in Abja Parish, Viljandi County